The Telmatherininae, the sail-fin silversides are a subfamily of atheriniform fish from the rainbowfish family, the Melanotaeniidae, inhabiting fresh and brackish water. All but the species Kalyptatherina helodes are restricted to the Indonesian island of Sulawesi, and most are found solely in the Malili Lake system, consisting of Matano and Towuti, and the small Lontoa (Wawantoa), Mahalona and Masapi.

They are named for the sail-like shape of their first dorsal fin in the males, which are also brightly coloured, compared with the females.

References
 

 
Melanotaeniidae
Fish subfamilies